An employment contract in English law is a specific kind of contract whereby one person performs work under the direction of another. The two main features of a contract is that work is exchanged for a wage, and that one party stands in a relationship of relative dependence, or inequality of bargaining power. On this basis, statute, and to some extent the common law, requires that compulsory rights are enforceable against the employer.

There are diverging views about the scope by which English law covers employees, as different tests are used for different kinds of employment rights, legislation draws an apparent distinction between a "worker" and an "employee", and the use of these terms are also different from their use in the European Court of Justice and European Union Directives. Under the Employment Rights Act 1996 section 230, an "employee" is anyone with a contract of service, which takes its meaning from a series of court cases that are also applicable for tax and tort law, where different judges have given different views about the meaning of the word. An "employee" is entitled to all types of rights that a worker has, but in addition the rights to reasonable notice before a fair dismissal and redundancy, protection in the event of an employer's insolvency or sale of the business, a statement of the employment contract, rights to take maternity leave or time off for child care, and an occupational pension.

A "worker" is a broader concept in its statutory formulation, and catches more people, but does not carry as many rights. A worker means any person who personally performs work, and is not a client or a customer. A worker is entitled to a minimum wage, holidays, to join a trade union, all anti-discrimination laws, and health and safety protection.

Scope of employment rights

As yet, the UK has not consolidated a comprehensive definition of the people to whom employment rights and duties apply. Statute and case law, both domestic and European, use 2 main definitions, with approximately six others. The EU does have one consolidated definition of a ‘worker’, which is someone who has a contract for work in return for a wage, and also stands as the more vulnerable party to the contract. This reflects the kernel of classical labour law theory, that an employment contract is one infused with “inequality of bargaining power”, and stands as a justification for mandating additional terms to what might otherwise be agreed under a system of total freedom of contract.

UK courts have agreed that an employment contract is one of a specific type, and that it cannot be equated with a commercial agreement. However, UK statutes deploy two main definitions, of an ‘employee’ and a ‘worker’, with a different number of rights. The government may also pass secondary legislation to include specific groups of people into the ‘employee’ category. An ‘employee’ has all available rights (all the rights of a ‘worker’ but also child care, retirement and job security rights). The meaning is explicitly left to the common law under the main statute, the Employment Rights Act 1996 section 230, and has developed according to the classical 19th century contrast between a contract ‘of service’ and one ‘for services’. While the classical test was that an employee was subject to a sufficient degree of ‘control’, new forms of work where people were had greater autonomy outside the factory to choose how to do their jobs, meant that, particularly from the mid-20th century, additional tests of employment were developed. Multiple factors, including how much one could be said to be ‘integrated’ into the business, or whether one metaphorically wore the ‘badge’ of the organisation, were looked at, with a focus, it was said on ‘economic reality’ and form over substance. Multiple relevant factors would include how much the employee was ‘controlled’, if they owned their tools, if they had the chance of profit and bore the risk of loss. But in the late 1970s and 1980s, some courts began to speak of a new test of ‘mutuality of obligation’. One view of this was merely that workers exchanged work for a wage. Another view stated that the employment relationship had to be one where there was an ongoing obligation to offer and accept work. This led to cases where employers, typically of people on low wages and little legal understanding, pleaded that they had only hired a person on a casual basis and thus should not be entitled to the major job security rights.

In addition, a ‘worker’ is defined in ERA 1996 section 230 as someone with a contract of employment or who personally performs work and is not a client or a customer. So this concept has greater scope, and protects more people, than does the term ‘employee’. This class of person is entitled to a safe system of work, a minimum wage and limits on working time, as well as discrimination and trade union rights, but not job security, child care and retirement rights. This concept thus reaches up to protect people who are quasi-self-employed professionals, albeit not so vulnerable, such as a home cleaner, or music teacher who visits student homes, or in certain cases a taxi cab driver.

Autoclenz Ltd v Belcher
Jivraj v Hashwani [2011] UKSC 40, arbitrators do not have employment contracts.
Governing Body of Clifton Middle School v Askew [2000] ICR 286, employment relationship
Edmonds v Lawson [2000] EWCA Civ 69, [2000] IRLR 391, pupillage, not an apprentice?
Mingeley v Pennock and Ivory (t/a Amber Cars) [2004] EWCA Civ 328, taxi driver wearing the organisation's badge
Hall v Woolston Hall Leisure Ltd [2000] EWCA Civ 170, illegality does not lose someone discrimination protection
Beloff v Pressdram Ltd [1973] 1 All ER 241
Ferguson v John Dawson & Partners (Contractors) Ltd [1976] EWCA Civ 7, [1976] 1 WLR 1213, Megaw LJ, declarations of employee status to be "wholly disregarded"
Calder v H Kitson Vickers & Sons (Engineers) Ltd [1988] ICR 232, 251, Ralph Gibson LJ says declarations are not conclusive, but relevant
Newnham Farms Ltd v Powell (2003) EAT/0711/01/MAA, employment contract arising from conduct
Aslam v Uber BV (2016), scope of employment rights for Uber drivers, "worker" concept

Mutuality of obligation
Clark v Oxfordshire HA [1998] IRLR 125
Hall v Woolston Hall Leisure Ltd [2000] IRLR 578, dependent entrepreneur
Consistent Group v Kalwak [2008] EWCA Civ 430
Lemmerman v. A.T. Williams Oil Co., 350 S.E.2d 83 (1986)

Employment rights
Employee
statement of contract, ERA 1996 s 1
reasonable notice, ERA 1996 s 86
unfair dismissal, ERA 1996 s 94
redundancy, ERA 1996 s 139
guaranteed pay on employer insolvency, ERA 1996 s 94
TUPER 2006, Business Transfers Directive 2001/23
maternity, paternity and parental leave
request flexible working time, ERA 1996 s 80F
right to return to work
Information and Consultation of Employees Directive 91/533
Income Tax (Earnings and Pensions) Act 2003, Part 11, employed earner, ‘gainfully employed under a contract of service’
contributions to National Insurance, SSCBA 1992 (c 4) ss 1(2)(a)(i) and 2(1)(a)

Worker
union organisation, TULRCA 1992
minimum wage, NMWA 1998
28 days holiday, working time limits, WTR 1998
Collective Redundancies Directive 98/59, though UK reg's used ‘employee’
free movement within EU, TFEU, C 53/91 Levin and C 256/01 Allonby

Construction of employment

France v James Coombes & Co [1929] AC 496
Lloyds Bank Ltd v Bundy [1975] QB 326
Pao On v Lau Yiu Long [1979] UKPC 2
National Westminster Bank plc v Morgan [1985] 1 All ER 821
Johnson v Unisys Limited [2001] UKHL 13
Reda v Flag Ltd [2002] UKPC 38
Gisda Cyf v Barratt [2010] UKSC 41
Autoclenz Ltd v Belcher [2011] UKSC 41

Express terms

Once a person's work contract is categorised, the courts have specific rules for determining, beyond the statutory minimum charter of rights, what are its terms and conditions. Analogous rules for incorporation of terms, and implication terms exist as in the ordinary law of contract, however in ‘’Gisda Cyf v Barratt’’, Lord Kerr emphasised that this process of construction is one that must be “intellectually segregated” from the general law of contract, because of the relation of dependency an employee has. In this case, Ms Barratt was told her employment was terminated in a letter that she opened 3 days after its arrival. When, 3 months and 2 days after arrival, she lodged an unfair dismissal claim, the employer argued it was time barred on the ground that in ordinary contract law one is bound by a notice when a reasonable person would have read a message. The Supreme Court held that Ms Barratt was in time for a claim because she was only bound by the notice when she actually read it. The applicable in employment was different, given the purpose of employment law to protect the employee. From formation to termination, employment contracts are to be construed in the context of statutory protection of dependent workers.

Statutory compulsory terms: right to statement, payment of wages, notice, fair dismissal, redundancy, minimum wage, working hours, pension
British Telecommunications plc v Ticehurst [1992] ICR 383
Cheltenham Borough Council v Laird [2009] EWHC 1253 QB, on misrepresentations before entering an employment contract

Incorporation of terms
The terms of employment are all those things promised to an employee when work begins, so long as they do not contravene statutory minimum rights. In addition, terms can be incorporated by reasonable notice, for instance by referring to a staff handbook in a written employment agreement, or even in a document in a filing cabinet next to the staff handbook. While without express wording they are presumed not binding between the union and employer, a collective agreement may give rise to individual rights. The test applied by the courts is to ask loosely whether its terms are ‘apt’ for incorporation, and not statements of ‘policy’ or ‘aspiration’. Where the collective agreement's words are clear, a "last in, first out" rule was held to potentially qualify, but another clause purporting to censure compulsory redundancies was held to sound like it was binding ‘in honour’ only.

Parkwood v Alemo – Herron [2010] IRLR 298, incorporation of varying collective agreement terms
Trade Union and Labour Relations (Consolidation) Act 1992, ss 179, 180, 236
Harlow v Artemis International Corp Ltd [2008] EWHC 1126 (QB), online redundancy incorporated
Johnstone v Bloomsbury Health Authority [1991] 2 All ER 293, law implied, safe work over flex cl
Henry v London Greater Transport Services Ltd [2002] EWCA Civ 488, varying collag binding maybe w/o vote
Robertson v British Gas Corp [1983] ICR 351, bonus in collag binding
Alexander v Standard Telephones & Cables Ltd (No 2) [1991] IRLR 287 13
Camden Exhibition & Display Ltd v Lynott [1966] 1 QB 555 13
Malone v British Airways plc [2010] IRLR 431; [2010] EWHC 302 (QB) incorporation of perks into from a collective agreement into individual contract and variation

Implied terms favouring employees
In addition to statutory rights, expressly agreed terms and incorporated terms, the contractual hallmark of the employment relation is the series of standardised implied terms (or terms implied in law) that accompany it. In addition to individualised implied terms that the courts construe to reflect the reasonable expectations of the parties, the courts have long held that employees are owed additional obligations, such as a safe system of work and payment of wages even when the employer has no work to offer. Reflecting more recent priorities, employers have also been recognised to have a duty to inform their employees of their workplace pension rights, although they have stopped short of requiring employers to give advice on qualifying for workplace disability benefits. The key implied term, however, is the duty of good faith, or “mutual trust and confidence”. This is a flexible concept that is applied in a broad variety of circumstances leading to remedies in damages or an injunction, such as to require employers do not act in an authoritarian manner, call employees names behind their back, treat workers unequally when upgrading pay, run the company as a front for international crime, or exercise discretion to award a bonus capriciously. There is tension among judges about the extent to which the core implied term of mutual trust and confidence can be 'contracted out of', with the House of Lords having held that the parties are "free" to do so, while others approach the question as a matter of construction of the agreement which is within exclusive judicial competence to define.

The second, and older hallmark of the employment contract is that employees are bound to follow their employers’ instructions while at work, so long as that does not contravene statute or their agreed terms. Every employment relation leaves the employer with a residue of discretion, historically expressed as the ‘master-servant’ relationship. Today, in practice, this leaves the employer with the ability to vary the terms of work in accordance with business need. The courts have allowed this to continue, so long as it does not contradict a contract's express terms, which always require an employee's consent, or renegotiation of a collective agreement. However, it has also been held that employers may insert ‘flexibility clauses’ allowing them to reserve the right to vary any contract term. The limits of the courts’ tolerance of such practices are evident if they touch procedures for accessing justice, or potentially if they would contravene the duty of mutual trust and confidence.

Master and servant: discretion of employer outside written terms, flexibility
Devonald v Rosser & Sons [1906] 2 KB 728, fact implied, risk of no work
Sagar v Ridehalgh & Sons Ltd [1931] 1 Ch 310, implied by custom, wage deductions
Wilsons and Clyde Coal Ltd v English [1938] AC 57, law implied, safe work
Wilson v Racher [1974] ICR 428, mtc manners, justifying termination
United Bank Ltd v Akhtar [1989] IRLR 507 14: in this case, the tribunal ruled that the implied term of mutual trust and confidence did not override an express term in the contract regarding mobility, but the contract needed to be interpreted "in such a way that it included an implied requirement that reasonable notice would be given, and that discretion concerning financial assistance [would] be exercised" to assist the employee with moving house.
Mahmud and Malik v BCCI SA [1998] AC 20, mtc implied, law implied, reputation
Transco plc v O'Brien [2002] EWCA Civ 379, mtc implied for equal treatment
Crossley v Faithful & Gould Holdings Ltd [2004] EWCA Civ 293, law, not implied for finance advice
Woods v WM Car Services (Peterborough) Ltd [1981] ICR 666, EAT; [1982] ICR 693 11
Baldwin v Brighton and Hove City Council [2007] IRLR 232, [2007] ICR 680 (EAT) 11
Crowson Fabrics Ltd v Rider [2007] IRLR 288; [2007] EWHC 2942 (Ch) 11
Home Office v Evans [2007] EWCA Civ 1089, [2008] IRLR 59 12
The Post Office v Roberts [1980] IRLR 347 12
Mallone v BPB Industries plc [2002] EWCA Civ 126 12
Luke v Stoke County Council [2007] EWCA Civ 761 13

Implied terms favouring employers
Cresswell v Board of Inland Revenue [1984] ICR 508, using new technology, er discretion
Dryden v Greater Glasgow Health Board [1992] IRLR 469, varying work rule book no breach
French v Barclays Bank plc [1998] IRLR 646, bridge loan withdrawal mtc breach
Alexander v Standard Telephones & Cables Ltd (No 2) [1991] IRLR 287, collag with lifo not intended incorp
Kaur v MG Rover Group Ltd [2004] EWCA 1507, collag, no comp redundancy not intended
Rigby v Ferodo Ltd [1988] ICR 29, wage reduction, insist on terms
Hussman Manufacturing Ltd v Weir [1998] IRLR 288 13
Jones v Associated Tunnelling Co Ltd [1981] IRLR 477 14
Wandsworth London Borough Council v D’Silva [1998] IRLR 193 14
Lee v GEC Plessy Telecommunications Ltd [1993] IRLR 383 14
Bateman v ASDA [2010] IRLR 370, complete flexibility clause
Harlow v Artemis International Corp Ltd [2008] IRLR 629; [2008] EWHC 1126 (QB) variation and termination of the employment contract

Performance, breach and termination
Part performance
Wiluszynski v London Borough of Tower Hamlets [1989] ICR 439, strike wages, part performance
Secretary of State for Employment v ASLEF (No 2) [1972] ICR 19, work to rule, no good faith is breach
British Telecommunications plc v Ticehurst [1992] ICR 383, work to rule, part performance
Johnson v Unisys Limited [2001] UKHL 13
Buckland v Bournemouth University [2010] IRLR 445

Theory of employment

FW Taylor, Scientific Management (1911)
FJ Roethlisberger and WJ Dickson, Management and the Worker (Harvard University Press 1939)
The ‘Hawthorne Experiment’ was originally whether changes in light might affect worker productivity in tests carried out at the Hawthorne Works, Illinois from 1924 to 1932. The observers realised that workers might try to work harder when lights went dimmer simply because they knew they were being observed. When people felt like they were being notice or consulted with, productivity went up even more.

D Guest and R Peccei, ‘Partnership at Work: Mutuality and the Balance of Advantage’ (2001) 39 BJIR 207, employers emphasise the mutual gains that can be achieved by partnership between management and workers.
D Katz, ‘The Motivational Basis of Organisational Behavior’ (1964) 9 Behavioural Science 131
CA Smith, DW Organ and JP Near, ‘Organisational Citizenship Behavior: Its Nature and Antecedents’ (1983) 68
P Rosenthal, S Hill and R Peccei, ‘Checking Out Service: Evaluating Excellence, HRM and TQM in Retailing’ (1997) 11 Work, Employment and Society 481
D Ariely, The Upside of Irrationality (2011) chs 1-3

See also

Trades Union Congress
British labour law
GMB (trade union) § Landmark Uber employment tribunal case
Baldwin v Brighton City Council [2007] IRLR 232, implied terms
Crowson Fabrics v Rider [2007] IRLR 288; [2007] EWHC 2942 (Ch)
Home Office v Evans [2008] IRLR 59; [2008] EWCA Civ 1089
Standard Life v Gorman [2010] IRLR 233
Luke v Stoke CC [2007] EWCA Civ 761
Cerberus Software Ltd v Rowley [2001] IRLR 159
Harper v Virgin Net Ltd [2004] IRLR 390
Eastwood v Magnox Electric plc [2004] IRLR 732
Fraser v Hmlad Ltd [2006] IRLR 687
Murray v Leisureplay plc [2005] IRLR 946
Kulkarni v MK NHS Trust [2009] IRLR 829
Mezey v SW London NHS Trust [2010] IRLR 512
Edwards v Chesterfield NHS Trust [2010] IRLR 702

Notes

References
O Kahn Freund, ‘Legal Framework’ in A Flanders and H Clegg, System of Industrial Relations in Great Britain (Blackwell 1954) 58 13
P Davies and M Freedland, Kahn-Freund's Labour and the Law (3rd edn Stevens 1983) 18 12
S Webb and B Webb, Industrial Democracy (Longmans 1902) 12
P Rosenthal, S Hill and R Peccei, ‘Checking Out Service: Evaluating Excellence, HRM and TQM in Retailing’ (1997) 11 Work, Employment and Society 481 12

External links
Employment status, gov.uk
Trades Union Congress website

United Kingdom labour law